Somewhere in Camp is a 1942 British comedy film directed by John E. Blakeley and starring Frank Randle, Harry Korris and Robbie Vincent. The film continues the adventures of Private Randle from the 1940 film Somewhere in England. It was followed in 1943 by Somewhere on Leave.

Plot
Three army Privates (Frank Randle, Robbie Vincent and Dan Young) and their Sergeant (Harry Korris) devise a scheme to help Private Trevor (John Singer) woo the Commanding Officer's daughter (Jean Rivers). All efforts fail until Sergeant Korris drags up as a love-struck housekeeper.

Cast

 Frank Randle - Pte. Randle
 Harry Korris - Sgt. Korris
 Robbie Vincent - Pte. Enoch
 Dan Young - Pte. Young
 John Singer - Pte. Jack Trevor
 Antoinette Lupino - Jean Rivers
 Peggy Novak - Mrs Rivers	
 Clifford Buckton - Colonel Rivers	
 Anthony Bazell - Captain Brown	
 Gus Aubrey - Captain Lofty	
 Ernest Dale - Private Dale	
 Arthur Wilton - Private Wilton	
 Billy Pardoe - Lt. Appleby	
 Clifford Cobb - Dental M.O.	
 Brian Herbert - Corporal Reed	
 Arthur Denton - Charlie the Lodger	
 Ronnie Kay - Randle, Jnr	
 Keith Shepherd - Police Inspector	
 Esme Lewis - Nurse to M.O.	
 Vi Kaley - Maid in Sketch
 Nora Gordon - Matron	
 Roma Rice - Girl Lodger	
 Evie Carcroft - Mrs Korris	
 Edna Wood - Lady at the Dance

Critical reception
The Spinning Image wrote, "It would be easy to dismiss Randle's films as crude, basic and cheaply made. They are all these things, but they also preserve the work of a great character comedian and hero to thousands. They should be viewed for what they were, mass entertainment with no frills, and Randle's memory should be treasured as an outstanding example of the popular culture of his day". TV Guide described it as "A lively music-hall adventure...Eighty eight minutes of episodic silliness and tolerable musical numbers."

References

Bibliography
 Rattigan, Neil. This is England: British film and the People's War, 1939-1945. Associated University Presses, 2001.

External links

1942 films
1942 comedy films
Films directed by John E. Blakeley
British comedy films
Military humor in film
British black-and-white films
Films scored by Percival Mackey
Films shot in Greater Manchester
1940s English-language films
1940s British films